Falley Seminary (1836-1883) was a school in Fulton, Oswego County, New York. It was named in honor of Mrs. M. E. Falley, who gave the institution .

History
The Fulton Female Seminary was incorporated by the New York State Legislature May 25, 1836, and admitted by the Regents February 5, 1839. Lucy Maynard Salmon was its first principal. On April 11, 1842, the name changed to Fulton Academy. On April 11, 1849, it became the Falley Seminary of the Black River Conference. On March 5, 1857, it merged and became the "Falley Seminary". It functioned as a preparatory school for girls attended by locals and out-of-area boarding students. Later, it served as a post-secondary seminary of the Presbyterian church, and still later, of the Methodist Conference.

Alumni
 Candy Cummings (1848-1924), professional baseball pitcher, credited with inventing the curveball
 Esther Baker Steele (1835–1911), educator, author, traveler, philanthropist

Further reading

References

Defunct private universities and colleges in New York (state)
1836 establishments in New York (state)
1883 disestablishments in New York (state)
Education in Oswego County, New York
Seminaries and theological colleges in New York (state)
Girls' schools in New York (state)
Educational institutions established in 1836
Educational institutions disestablished in 1883
Defunct girls' schools in the United States